Puclice is a municipality and village in Domažlice District in the Plzeň Region of the Czech Republic. It has about 400 inhabitants.

Administrative parts
Villages of Doubrava and Malý Malahov are administrative parts of Puclice.

References

Villages in Domažlice District